George Washington Armstrong (February 27, 1827 - July 1, 1877) was a Minnesota business owner and politician. He served as Treasurer for the Minnesota Territory and was elected as the first Minnesota State Treasurer, serving from 1858 to 1860.

Notes

1827 births
1877 deaths
Minnesota Territory officials
State treasurers of Minnesota
Place of birth missing
Businesspeople from Minnesota
19th-century American politicians
19th-century American businesspeople